Patriotic Gore: Studies in the Literature of the American Civil War is a 1962 book of historical and literary criticism written by Edmund Wilson.  It consists of 16 chapters about the works and lives of almost 30 writers, including
Ambrose Bierce,
George Washington Cable,
Mary Boykin Chesnut,
Kate Chopin,
John William De Forest (who, as Henry Steele Commager puts it, "surprisingly gets more space than any other writer, North or South"),
Charlotte Forten,
Ulysses Grant, 
Francis Grierson,
Nathaniel Hawthorne,
Hinton Rowan Helper,
Oliver Wendell Holmes, Jr., 
Henry James,
Sidney Lanier,
Abraham Lincoln,
John S. Mosby,
Frederick Law Olmsted,
Thomas Nelson Page,
Harriet Beecher Stowe,
Albion W. Tourgée
John Townsend Trowbridge,
Mark Twain, and 
Walt Whitman. In addition to De Forest, Wilson pays particular attention to Cable, Grant, Grierson, Holmes, and Stowe, choices considered "catholic and unexpected" at the time of its publication.

Wilson almost entirely ignores writers who are African-American, with Forten as an exception, notably lacking mention of Frederick Douglass. The book's analysis of the Civil War borrows heavily from now-discredited Lost Cause ideology, using "language no diehard Lost Cause advocate of the turn of the 20th century nor neo-Confederate of the early 21st could improve upon," and that "Wilson simply took no interest in black literature, and seemed completely unaware of slave narratives" reveals almost as "much about Wilson’s own moral blindness [as] about the state of knowledge in elite white circles of African-American history and letters in the 1950s and even early 1960s."

The "patriotic gore" of the title is taken from Maryland's former (until 2021) pro-Confederate state song, Maryland, My Maryland." "wrenched rather violently" from a line about the Baltimore riot of 1861 in The book's introduction has been called a "mesmerizing if troubling manifesto", written "in the midst of various Cold War crises"; the introduction is a "blunt and sustained critique of the Cold War and of war itself". It has been called "everything from shocking to naive to brilliant; some considered it unpatriotic, even un-American."

Henry Steele Commager described the book as a "series of reflections on [Civil War] literature and on the men and women, and the societies, that produced it"; he characterized it as "original, skeptical, allusive, penetrating. It is discursive, ranging widely from North to South, and even more widely in time."

References

Books of literary criticism
American Civil War books
1962 non-fiction books
Oxford University Press books